Deogarh, also known as Devgarh, is a village in Mohkhed tehsil of Chhindwara District of the Indian state of Madhya Pradesh. It is located 24 miles southwest of Chhindwara, picturesquely situated on a crest of the hills. It was the centre of the Gond kingdom of Deogarh.

Attractions
 Deogarh Fort

References

Sources
 Hunter, William Wilson, Sir, et al. (1908). Imperial Gazetteer of India, Volume 10. 1908–1931; Clarendon Press, Oxford.

External links

Cities and towns in Chhindwara district